Gerald Davis (23 February 1930 – 31 August 1991) was a British television writer, best known for his contributions to the science-fiction genre. He also wrote for the soap operas Coronation Street and United!.

From 1966 until the following year Davis was the story editor of the popular BBC science-fiction series Doctor Who, for which he created the character Jamie McCrimmon and co-created the popular cybernetic monsters known as the Cybermen, who continue to make appearances in the show, having been revived in the new run. His fellow co-creator of these creatures was the programme's unofficial scientific adviser Dr. Kit Pedler. Following their work on Doctor Who the pair teamed up in 1970 to create the science-fiction programme Doomwatch. Doomwatch ran for three seasons on BBC One from 1970 to 1972 and spawned a novel written by Davis and Pedler, a subsequent cinema film and a 1999 revival on Channel 5.

Davis briefly returned to writing Doctor Who in 1975, penning the original script for Revenge of the Cybermen, though the transmitted version was heavily rewritten by then script-editor Robert Holmes. Davis also adapted several of his scripts into novelisations for Target Books' Doctor Who imprint. With Kit Pedler he wrote the science-fiction novels Mutant 59: The Plastic Eater (1971), expanded from their script for the first episode of Doomwatch; Brainrack (1974); and The Dynostar Menace (1975).

In the 1980s Davis worked in America both in television and on feature films such as The Final Countdown (1980). In late 1989 he and Terry Nation made a joint but unsuccessful bid to take over production of Doctor Who and reformat the series mainly for the American market. Gerry Davis died on 31 August 1991.

Writing credits

References

External links

Filmography

1930 births
1991 deaths
British television writers
British science fiction writers
20th-century British novelists
20th-century screenwriters